World No. 1 Caroline Wozniacki was the defending champion, but lost in the quarterfinals to Flavia Pennetta.

Agnieszka Radwańska won the title, defeating Andrea Petkovic in the final, 7–5, 0–6, 6–4. This was the second consecutive year that the champion in Beijing also won the title in Tokyo.

Seeds

The four Tokyo semifinalists received a bye into the second round. They are as follows:
  Victoria Azarenka
  Petra Kvitová
  Agnieszka Radwańska
  Vera Zvonareva

Qualifying

Draw

Finals

Top half

Section 1

Section 2

Bottom half

Section 3

Section 4

External links
 Main Draw and Qualifying Draw

China Open - Singles